The European Parliament election of 2019 took place in Italy on 26 May 2019.

Lega Nord (PD), which came first also at the country-level, was by far the most voted list in Trentino (37.7%), while the South Tyrolean People's Party (SVP) was by far the largest party in South Tyrol (46.5%). SVP's Herbert Dorfmann, the outgoing two-term MEP, was largely the most voted candidate in the region (95,753 preference votes), followed by Matteo Salvini (Lega Nord, 43,321), Roberto Battiston (PD, 23,788), Remate Holzeisen (Team K–More Europe, 22,930) and Norbert Lantschner (Greens–Green Europe, 9,825). Dorfmann was the only candidate from the region to be elected (in his case, re-elected) to the European Parliament.

Results
Trentino

South Tyrol

References

Elections in Trentino-Alto Adige/Südtirol
European Parliament elections in Italy
2019 European Parliament election
2019 elections in Italy